B. nivea may refer to:

 Banksia nivea, the honeypot dryandra, a shrub species endemic to Western Australia
 Boehmeria nivea, the ramie, a flowering plant species native to eastern Asia
 Buddleja nivea, a shrub species endemic to western China

See also 
 Nivea (disambiguation)